The 1990 Espirito Santo Trophy took place 18–21 October at Russley Golf Club in Christchurch, New Zealand. 

It was the 14th women's golf World Amateur Team Championship for the Espirito Santo Trophy. The tournament was a 72-hole stroke play team event with 26 team entries, each with three players. The best two scores for each round counted towards the team total.

The United States team won the Trophy, defending their title from two years ago and earning the title for the 11th time, beating the hosting country team New Zealand by 12 strokes. New Zealand earned the silver medal while the combined team of Great Britain & Ireland took the bronze on third place another eight strokes back.

Teams 
26 teams entered the event and completed the competition. Each team had three players.

Results 

Sources:

Individual leaders 
There was no official recognition for the lowest individual scores.

References

External links 
World Amateur Team Championships on International Golf Federation website

Espirito Santo Trophy
Espirito Santo Trophy
Espirito Santo Trophy
Espirito Santo Trophy
Espirito Santo Trophy